The national coal strike of 1912 was the first national strike by coal miners in the United Kingdom. Its main goal was securing a minimum wage. After 37 days, the government intervened and ended the strike by passing the Coal Mines Act, extending minimum wage provisions to the mining industry and certain other industries with many unskilled manual jobs.

The dispute centred upon an attempt by the Miners Federation of Great Britain, the main trade union representing coal miners, to secure a minimum wage for miners in their district and replace the complicated wage structure then in place which often made it difficult for a miner to earn a fair day's wage. The same issues had caused a major dispute the previous year in South Wales and had become a national issue. The strike was a repeat of the unsuccessful strike of 1894 which also sought a minimum wage.

The strike began at the end of February in Alfreton, Derbyshire and spread nationwide. Nearly one million miners took part. It ended on 6 April after 37 days. The strike caused considerable disruption to train and shipping schedules.

External links 
 Peter Gill. "National coal strike".
 Michael Kelly. "Nostalgia: 100th anniversary of the national miners' strike". The Journal.

References 

1912 labor disputes and strikes
1912 in the United Kingdom
Miners' labour disputes in the United Kingdom